Wurmbea dilatata is a species of plant in the Colchicaceae family that is endemic to Australia.

Description
The species is a cormous perennial herb that grows to a height of 5–12 cm. Its pink and white flowers appear in August.

Distribution and habitat
The species is found in the Avon Wheatbelt, Geraldton Sandplains and Swan Coastal Plain IBRA bioregions of western Western Australia. It grows in white, yellow and grey sands and clay soils.

References

dilatata
Monocots of Australia
Angiosperms of Western Australia
Plants described in 1980
Taxa named by Terry Desmond Macfarlane